The blue-and-yellow macaw (Ara ararauna), also known as the blue-and-gold macaw, is a large South American parrot with mostly blue top parts and light orange underparts, with gradient hues of green on top of its head. It is a member of the large group of neotropical parrots known as macaws. It inhabits forest (especially varzea, but also in open sections of terra firme or unflooded forest), woodland and savannah of tropical South America. They are popular in aviculture because of their striking color, ability to talk, ready availability in the marketplace, and close bonding to humans. They can also live for 65–70 years.

Taxonomy 
The blue-and-yellow macaw was formally described by the Swedish naturalist Carl Linnaeus in 1758 in the tenth edition of his Systema Naturae. He placed it with all the other parrots in the genus Psittacus and coined the binomial name Psittacus ararauna. This macaw is now one of the eight extant species placed in the genus Ara that was erected in 1799 by the French naturalist Bernard Germain de Lacépède. The genus name is from ará meaning "macaw" in the Tupi language of Brazil. The word is an onomatopoeia based on the sound of their call. The specific epithet ararauna comes from the Tupi Arára úna meaning "big dark parrot" for the hyacinth macaw. The word ararauna had been used by the German naturalist Georg Marcgrave in 1648 in his Historia Naturalis Brasiliae. The species is monotypic: no subspecies are recognised.

Description 
They are vivid in appearance with bright aqua blue feathers on the top of their body except for the head, which is lime colored. The bottom, however, is a rich deep yellow/light orange. Their beak is black, as well as the feathers under their chin. Its feet are of a gray color, save for black talons. The bird has white skin, with its face having nearly no feathers beside a few black ones spaced apart from each other forming a striped pattern around the eyes. The irises are pale light yellow.

Blue-and-yellow macaws can live from 30 to 35 years in the wild, and reach sexual maturity between the ages of 3 and 6 years.

Little variation in plumage is seen across the range. Some birds have a more orange or "butterscotch" underside color, particularly on the breast. This was often seen in Trinidad birds and others of the Caribbean area. The blue-and-yellow macaw uses its powerful beak for breaking nutshells, and for climbing up and hanging from trees. As well as nuts, it will also feed on seeds, fruits, vegetable matter, bark and leaves, also insects, snails and small animals.

Distribution and habitat 
This species occurs in Colombia, Venezuela, Peru, Brazil, Bolivia, Ecuador, and Paraguay. The range extends slightly into Central America, where it is restricted to Panama. While most breed in rural and forested areas, small numbers breed in urban cities such as Rondonópolis (Mato Grosso, Brazil), nesting in dead palms planted for ornamental purposes alongside city roads. Although they were nearly wiped out in Trinidad due to human activity during the 1970s, a recent programme of reintroduction has proved successful. Between 1999 and 2003, wild-caught blue-and-yellow macaws were translocated from Guyana to Trinidad, in an attempt to re-establish the species in a protected area around Nariva Swamp; despite this, the IUCN still lists them as extirpated from the country. A small breeding population descended from introduced birds is found in Puerto Rico, and another has inhabited Miami-Dade County, Florida, since the mid-1980s.

Breeding 

The blue-and-yellow macaw generally mates for life. They nest almost exclusively in dead palms and most nests are in Mauritia flexuosa palms. The female typically lays two or three eggs. The female incubates the eggs for about 28 days. One chick is dominant and gets most of the food; the others perish in the nest. Chicks fledge from the nest about 97 days after hatching. The male bird's color signals readiness for breeding. The brighter and bolder the colors, the better the chance of getting a mate.

Conservation and threats 
The blue-and-yellow macaw is on the verge of being extirpated in Paraguay, but it still remains widespread and fairly common in a large part of mainland South America. The species is therefore listed as Least Concern by BirdLife International.  It is listed on CITES Appendix II, trade restricted. Its current wild population is estimated to be between 100,000 and 200,000 individuals.

Aviculture 
Even well-tended blue-and-yellow macaws are known to "scream" for attention, and make other loud noises. Loud vocalizations, especially "flock calls", and destructive chewing are natural parts of their behavior and should be expected in captivity. Due to their large size, they also require plentiful space in which to fly around. According to World Parrot Trust, an enclosure for a blue-and-yellow macaw should, if possible, be at least  in length. Captive macaws, kept with good diet, exercise, and veterinary care are known to have lived 60 or more years. People considering a macaw as a companion parrot must be aware of this and consider that the bird may outlive the owner.

The blue-and-yellow macaw has been noted to blush its bare facial skin and fluff the feathers of its cheeks, head and nape when interacting with humans. This may be an expression of the parrot's emotional state.

Gallery

See also 
 List of macaws

References

Further reading 
 Doane, Bonnie Munro & Qualkinbush, Thomas (1994): My parrot, my friend : an owner's guide to parrot behavior. Howell Book House, New York. 
 Hilty, Steven L. (2003): Birds of Venezuela. Christopher Helm, London. 
 Forshaw, J.M. Parrots of the World. New Jersey. T.F.H. Publications Inc. 1978.

External links

 
 World Parrot Trust Parrot Encyclopedia – Species Profile
 Blue-and-yellow macaw videos, photos & sounds on the Internet Bird Collection.

blue-and-yellow macaw
blue-and-yellow macaw
Birds of Colombia
Birds of Venezuela
Birds of Brazil
Birds of the Guianas
Birds of the Amazon Basin
Birds of the Cerrado
Birds of Trinidad and Tobago
Birds of the Caribbean
Birds of Panama
Talking birds
Feral parrots
Species endangered by the pet trade
blue-and-yellow macaw
blue-and-yellow macaw
Articles containing video clips